Dame Marlene Robottom, is a British academic and educator.

Career
The former headteacher at the Mulberry School for Girls, Tower Hamlets, London, retired in December 2005 having led Mulberry School to notable success. During her time at the school, the Mulberry School for Girls achieved Beacon, Leading Edge, Training and International School status. Prior to leaving Mulberry, Robottom led and managed a successful £20 million PFI project to re-build the school. The school was part of the Excellence in Cities initiative and gained Investors in People recognition.

Dame Marlene later became a manager at EduTrust. She has been a practicing teacher for more than three decades. She is a member of numerous LEA consultative, advisory and working groups. She continues to support education as a primary school governor and through the London Challenge, National College for School Leadership and the NPQH programmes.

Honours
She was named a Dame Commander of the Order of the British Empire (DBE) in the 2000 New Year’s Honours "for services to education".

References

Heads of schools in London
Dames Commander of the Order of the British Empire
Living people
School governors
Women heads of schools in the United Kingdom
Year of birth missing (living people)
Place of birth missing (living people)